The Journal of Rural Mental Health is a biannual peer-reviewed academic journal published by the American Psychological Association on behalf of the National Association for Rural Mental Health. It covers rural mental health research, practice, and policy. It was established in 1977 and the editor-in-chief is James L. Werth, Jr. (Stone Mountain Health Services).

Abstracting and indexing 
The journal is abstracted and indexed in PsycINFO.

External links 
 
 National Association for Rural Mental Health

American Psychological Association academic journals
English-language journals
Publications established in 1977
Psychiatry journals
Biannual journals